Ian Cordial (14 November 1926 – 22 September 2000) was a former Scotland international rugby union player. Cordial played as a Centre.

Rugby career

Amateur career

Cordial played for Edinburgh Wanderers.

Provincial career

Cordial represented Edinburgh District. He played in the 1951-52 season Inter-City match against Glasgow District. He scored Edinburgh's try; their only points in the game. Glasgow won the match 6-3.

International career

He was capped for  four times in 1952, all of the caps coming in the Five Nations matches.

References

External links
 Find a Grave entry

1926 births
2000 deaths
Scottish rugby union players
Scotland international rugby union players
Rugby union centres
Edinburgh District (rugby union) players
Edinburgh Wanderers RFC players